Sereck Shallcross House, also known as Oakland, is a historic home located near Odessa, New Castle County, Delaware.  It was built in 1842, and is -story, five bay, brick dwelling with a flat roof.  It is "L"-shaped, with a two-story rear wing added in the 1880s. The design is influenced by the Greek Revival, Italianate, and Georgian styles.

It was listed on the National Register of Historic Places in 1973.

References

External links
 Oakland Plantation, Smokehouse, Intersection of Routes 428 & 429 (Saint Georges Hundred), Odessa, New Castle County, DE: 4 measured drawings and 2 data pages at Historic American Buildings Survey

Houses on the National Register of Historic Places in Delaware
Georgian architecture in Delaware
Italianate architecture in Delaware
Greek Revival houses in Delaware
Houses completed in 1842
Houses in New Castle County, Delaware
National Register of Historic Places in New Castle County, Delaware